Neocampanella is a genus of fungus in the family Marasmiaceae. The genus is monotypic, containing the single species Neocampanella blastanos.

See also
 List of Marasmiaceae genera

References

Marasmiaceae
Monotypic Agaricales genera